Paulina Ligocka (born 25 May 1984) is a Polish snowboarder. In March 2006 she finished second in the cumulative final standing of the World Cup in half-pipe. She was an Olympian at the 2006 Winter Olympics in Turin, where she was the bearer of the Polish flag at the opening ceremonies.  She competed in half-pipe, finishing 17th.

Born in Gliwice, she now lives in the town of Cieszyn, which lies on the border with the Czech Republic.

References 
 FIS-Ski.com Biography/Results

1984 births
Living people
Polish female snowboarders
Olympic snowboarders of Poland
Snowboarders at the 2006 Winter Olympics
Snowboarders at the 2010 Winter Olympics
Sportspeople from Gliwice
Universiade medalists in snowboarding
Universiade gold medalists for Poland
Competitors at the 2005 Winter Universiade
Competitors at the 2007 Winter Universiade
21st-century Polish women